Beast Stalker is a 2008 Hong Kong action thriller film directed by Dante Lam (who also wrote the screenplay with Ng Wai-lun, and produced with Candy Leung and Cheung Hong-tat). The film stars Nicholas Tse, Nick Cheung, Zhang Jingchu and Liu Kai-chi. The film is about a traffic car accident that changes multiple people's lives forever.

Plot
Sergeant Tong Fei (Nicholas Tse) is a no-nonsense Hong Kong cop. One day during a police bust with his team who include Sun (Liu Kai Chi), Christy (Sherman Chung) and Michael (Derek Kok). During a raid, Sun is shot by a fleeing suspect due to an unreliable snitch and Michael failing to act during a door breach. Sun's bulletproof vest saves him from harm. Tong berates Michael and vows to have him transferred off the team. On the same day, Tong and Sun are called to investigate a car stolen by a crew of criminals who just finished committing a series of robberies. When Tong and Sun pursue them, they get into a serious car accident involving a passing Jeep who seriously cripples Sun. Tong shoots at the fleeing criminals, killing 2 of them and causing them to crash the hijacked car. The lead criminal falls into a coma. To Tong's horror, he discovers he also accidentally shot dead Yee, the elder daughter of public prosecutor and single mother Gao Min (Zhang Jingchu), who was placed in the trunk of their car when the criminals hijacked Gao's vehicle. Unable to handle the guilt, Tong succumbs to a fog of pain. Gao, meanwhile, pours all her love and attention to her younger daughter Ling.

Three months later, the lead criminal Cheung Yat-tung (Philip Keung) awakens from his coma. Gao Min, who had been working hard on bringing him to justice, insists he stand trial immediately. However complications arise as Ling is suddenly kidnapped by a man seriously damaged in one eye known as Hung King (Nick Cheung) who does shady jobs for hire and has his own agenda.  Gao is threatened by the kidnapper to change evidence for Cheung's trial to get him acquitted. Tong is once again thrust into a cat and mouse game to not only save Gao's other daughter but also as redemption from his past mistakes.

Tong tries at first to enlist Gao's assistance but Gao outright refuses claiming she would rather have any other cop save Ling but not Tong as his appearance constantly reminds her of Yee. Tong's investigation goes off the books and leads him to a garbage centre where is discovers the kidnappers SIM card. Tong is forced to turn to help from Christy and then Michael, who at first refuses to cooperate because of Tong constantly writing bad reports about him in the past and also revealing that Michael is also Tong's cousin. After Tongg  apologizes for his actions in the past, Michael eventually relents and assists Tong track the sim card and also Gao's MMS and contact with the kidnapper revealing Ling is being held in an apartment with Neon Lights nearby.

As Tong and Sun try to pinpoint Ling's location. Sun goes for a lunch break in a restaurant but coincidentally spots Hung in the same restaurant Sun tries to discreetly alert Tong but Hung catches on and flees. A lengthy chase ensures where Tong attempts to Hung, but Hung's fighting skills overpower Tong and disarm him of his weapon. Gunshots from Tong's sidearm attract the attention of multiple Hong Kong PTU officers who gave chase, however Hung is able to evade all the officers in his way. Tong catches up with Hung, but Hung runs into a nearby armored car and knocks out a security guard commandeering his shotgun and pinning down Tong and the pursuing PTU officers. Haunted briefly by Yee's death, Tong eventually leaves cover and attempt to apprehend Hung but finds that Hung has disappeared and vanished from the scene.

Soon after, Tong is forced to surrender his sidearm, pending an officer involved investigation. Gao hears the news and arrives on scene. Tong reveals to Gao about the location where Ling was held. As Tong and Sun enters Hung's apartment, they discover a hidden room where they found Hung's wife whose in a deteriorative state. When Hung has taken back his wife from the police, Tong tracks him down through GPS where he finds Hung and beats him in the head with a rock. As Ling was recovered, Hung who is now fully blind, surrenders himself to the police. It was revealed that Hung was the driver of the Jeep from the earlier car accident, which results him critical injuries along with his wife. The film ends with Tong walks away with Ling as she reunites with her mother.

Cast 
 Nicholas Tse as Sergeant Tong Fei
 Nick Cheung as Hung King
 Zhang Jingchu as Ann Gao
 Miao Pu as Li
 Liu Kai-chi as Sun
 Sherman Chung as Christy
 Zhang He as Thomas
 Lau Kong as Chuen
 Derek Kok as Michael
 Joe Cheung as Judge Lee
 Philip Keung as Cheung Yat-tung
 Wong Suet-yin as Ling
 Wong Sum-yin as Yee
 Cheung Kwok-wai as Fai
 Chan Shu-chi as Chi
 Tse Kai-cheong as Tommy
 Cho King-man as King Man
 Ho Mei-yin as Teacher
 Lam Siu-ha as Baking Instructor
 Esther Kwan as Li (voice)

Reception 
Derek Elley of Variety wrote, "Crying out for a Stateside remake from its opening reel, stygian crimer Beast Stalker grips like a vise, and is unquestionably the finest Asian action-psychodrama since South Korea's The Chaser last year." Neil Young of The Hollywood Reporter wrote, "This glossy, flashily directed plausibility-stretcher picks up whenever the bad guy's unusual character and history are being explored, but flattens out when the focus shifts back from pursued to pursuer." G. Allen Johnson of the San Francisco Chronicle called it a new addition to "Hong Kong's great cycle of kinetic action films".

Awards and nominations

References

External links 
 
 
 

2008 films
2008 action thriller films
2000s police procedural films
2000s Cantonese-language films
Films about kidnapping
Films directed by Dante Lam
Films set in Hong Kong
Films shot in Hong Kong
Hong Kong action thriller films
Hong Kong detective films
Police detective films
2000s Hong Kong films